Sandra Marie Bezic (born April 6, 1956) is a Canadian pair skater, figure skating choreographer, and television commentator.  With her brother Val Bezic, she won the Canadian Figure Skating Championships from 1970 to 1974 and placed ninth at the 1972 Winter Olympics. Skate Canada announced on July 14, 2010, that she will be inducted into the Skate Canada Hall of Fame in the professional category

Early life
Bezic was born in Toronto, Ontario, on April 6, 1956. She is of Croatian descent. She is the younger sister of Val Bezic who was her skating partner.

Skating career
Bezic competed in Canadian national competitions and international competitions from 1967 to 1975. In 1975, during training for the 1976 Olympics, she tore her ankle ligaments and had to forgo the 1976 Olympics. She turned professional in 1976.

Bezic choreographed the competitive programs skated by many Olympic and World champions, including Barbara Underhill and Paul Martini (1984 Worlds), Brian Boitano (1988 Winter Olympics), Kristi Yamaguchi (1992 Winter Olympics), Kurt Browning (1993 Worlds), and Tara Lipinski (1998 Winter Olympics). She has also choreographed programs for Jill Trenary, Chen Lu, Joannie Rochette, Yuna Kim, Takahiko Kozuka, Jeremy Abbott (2015) and other skaters.

Bezic served as a commentator for NBC during the 2002, 2006, 2010, and 2014 Olympic games, the World Figure Skating Championships during the early 1990s, and numerous other skating events broadcast by NBC and CBC over the years.

For several years she was the director, co-producer, and choreographer for Stars on Ice, for which she won an Emmy Award in 2003. She has also choreographed for several television figure skating specials including Canvas of Ice, Carmen on Ice, and You Must Remember This.

Bezic is the author of The Passion to Skate,. She also served as a judge on the CBC television program Battle of the Blades in each season.

She is credited as Marlon Brando's skating coach in The Freshman (1990) and appears with him in the skating rink scene.

Competition results
Pair skating with Val Bezic:

Literature 
Eterovich, Adam S. Croatia at the Olympics, 1890s-1980s (!?!).  // CROWN – Croatian World Network, [Bach, Nenad N. (ed.)], ISSN 1847-3911, 08/3/2004, Retrieved 2010-02-17
Beisteiner, Johanna: Art music in figure skating, synchronized swimming and rhythmic gymnastics / Kunstmusik in Eiskunstlauf, Synchronschwimmen und rhythmischer Gymnastik. PhD thesis by Johanna Beisteiner, Vienna 2005, (German). The PhD thesis contains an extensive description and analysis of Carmen on Ice (Chapter II/2, pages 105–162). Article about the PhD thesis of Johanna Beisteiner in the catalogue of the Austrian Library Network. 2005. (German and English)

References

External links
 Sandra Bezic's Official Website

1956 births
Living people
Canadian female pair skaters
Canadian people of Croatian descent
Canadian figure skating coaches
Olympic figure skaters of Canada
Olympic Games broadcasters
Figure skaters from Toronto
Figure skaters at the 1972 Winter Olympics
Figure skating commentators
Figure skating choreographers
Female sports coaches